Kumyk (къумукъ тил, qumuq til, قموق تيل) is a Turkic language spoken by about 426,212 people, mainly by the Kumyks, in the Dagestan, North Ossetia and Chechen republics of the Russian Federation. Until the 20th century Kumyk was the lingua-franca of the Northern Caucasus.

Classification 
Kumyk language belongs to the Kipchak-Cuman subfamily of the Kipchak family of the Turkic languages. It's a descendant of the Cuman language, with likely influence from the Khazar language, and in addition contains words from the Bulghar and Oghuz substratum. The closest languages to Kumyk are Karachay-Balkar, Crimean Tatar, and Karaim languages.

Nikolay Baskakov, based on a 12th century scripture named Codex Cumanicus, included modern Kumyk, Karachai-Balkar, Crimean Tatar, Karaim, and the language of Mamluk Kipchaks in the linguistic family of the Cuman-Kipchak language. Samoylovich also considered Cuman-Kipchak close to Kumyk and Karachai-Balkar.

Amongst the dialects of the Kumyk there are Kaitag, Terek (Güçük-yurt and Braguny), Buynaksk (Temir-Khan-Shura) and Xasavyurt. The latter two became basis for the literary language.

History 
Kumyk had been a lingua-franca of the bigger part of the Northern Caucasus, from Dagestan to Kabarda, until the 1930s and was an official language of communication between the North-Eastern Caucasian nations and the Russian administration.

In 1848, a professor of the "Caucasian Tatar" (Kumyk) Timofey Makarov published the first ever grammatical book in Russian language for one of the Northern Caucasian languages, which was international Kumyk. Makarov wrote:

More than 90% of the Kumyks, according to 2010 census, also speak Russian, and those in Turkey and the Levant speak Turkish and Arabic.

Phonology

Orthography 
Kumyk has been used as a literary language in Dagestan and Caucasus for some time. During the 20th century the writing system of the language was changed twice: in 1929, the traditional Arabic script (called ajam) was first replaced by a Latin script, which was then replaced in 1938 by a Cyrillic script.

Latin based alphabet (1927–1937)

Cyrillic based alphabet (since 1937)

Literature and media 
Irchi Kazak (Ийрчы Къазакъ Yırçı Qazaq; born 1839) is usually considered to be the greatest poet of the Kumyk language. The first regular Kumyk newspapers and magazines appeared in 1917–18 under the editorship of Kumyk poet, writer, translator, and theatre figure Temirbolat Biybolatov (Temirbolat Biybolat). Currently, the newspaper Ёлдаш (Yoldash, "Companion"), the successor of the Soviet-era Ленин ёлу (Lenin yolu, "Lenin's Path"), prints around 5,000 copies 3 times a week.

The Kumyk language was learned by Russian classical authors such as Leo Tolstoy and Mikhail Lermontov, both of whom served in the Caucasus. The language is present in such works of Tolstoy as "The Raid", Cossacks, Hadji Murat, and Lermontov's - "A Hero of Our Time", Bestuzhev-Marlinsky's - "Molla-nur" and "Ammalat-bek".

Bibliography 
 Saodat Doniyorova and Toshtemirov Qahramonil. Parlons Koumyk. Paris: L'Harmattan, 2004. .

References

External links 

 Kumyks video and music
 Kumyk language newspaper "Ёлдаш" published in Dagestan
 Kumyk language on the website "Minority languages of Russia on the Net"
 Russian-Kumyk dictionary (1960)
 Holy Scriptures in the Kumyk language
 Kumyk information portal kumukia.com

 
Agglutinative languages
Kipchak languages
Languages of Russia
Dagestan
Turkic languages
Lingua francas